Schuchertinia is a genus of commensal athecate hydroids in the family Hydractiniidae.

Species
The World Register of Marine Species includes the following species in the genus:

Schuchertinia allmanii (Bonnevie, 1898)
Schuchertinia antonii (Miglietta, 2006)
Schuchertinia conchicola (Yamada, 1947)
Schuchertinia epiconcha (Stechow, 1908)
Schuchertinia milleri (Torrey, 1902)
Schuchertinia reticulata (Hirohito, 1988)
Schuchertinia uchidai (Yamada, 1947)

References

Hydractiniidae
Hydrozoan genera